Lin Huijun (Chinese: 林慧君; born 1 February 1993) is Chinese sprinter. She finished fourth in the 200 metres at the 2014 Asian Games and 2015 Asian Championships. She won multiple medals as part of the Chinese 4 × 100 metres relay.

Competition record

References

1993 births
Living people
Chinese female sprinters
Athletes (track and field) at the 2014 Asian Games
World Athletics Championships athletes for China
Asian Games medalists in athletics (track and field)
Asian Games gold medalists for China
Medalists at the 2014 Asian Games
People from Putian
Runners from Fujian
Competitors at the 2015 Summer Universiade
21st-century Chinese women